Amine "Zenga" Touahri (born 12 February 1989 in Hussein Dey, Algiers Province) is an Algerian footballer who is currently playing as a forward for WA Boufarik.

International career
Touahri was called up to participate in the 2010 UNAF U-23 Tournament. On 13 December 2010, he scored the sixth goal against the Cameroonian under 23 side. On November 16, 2011, he was selected as part of Algeria's squad for the 2011 CAF U-23 Championship in Morocco.

Honours
 Finalist of the Algerian Cup once with USM El Harrach in 2011

References

1989 births
Living people
People from Hussein Dey (commune)
Algerian footballers
USM El Harrach players
ES Sétif players
Algerian Ligue Professionnelle 1 players
Algeria under-23 international footballers
2011 CAF U-23 Championship players
Algeria youth international footballers
Association football forwards
21st-century Algerian people